Psychoanalysis: What Is It? is the debut studio album by American hip hop producer Prince Paul. Originally released by Wordsound Recordings in 1996, it was re-released by Tommy Boy Records in 1997 with a slightly different track listing and a different cover.

In 2012, it was listed by Complex as one of the "50 Albums That Were Unfairly Hated On". In 2015, Fact named it the 34th-best trip-hop album of all time.

Track listing

References

Further reading

External links
 

1996 debut albums
Concept albums
Prince Paul (producer) albums
Albums produced by Prince Paul (producer)
Tommy Boy Records albums
Trip hop albums by American artists